That Night may refer to:

 That Night!, a 1957 film directed by John Newland
 That Night (novel), a 1987 novel by Alice McDermott
 That Night, a 1992 film directed by Craig Bolotin
 "That Night" (song), a 2019 song by Carousel that represented Latvia in the Eurovision Song Contest 2019
 That Night (TV series), a 2021 South Korean television series based on Criminal Justice

See also